"Famous Friends" is a song recorded by American country music singers Chris Young and Kane Brown. It was released on November 20, 2020, as the third single from Young's eighth studio album of the same name. Young wrote and produced the song with Corey Crowder, with additional writing from Cary Barlowe.

Background
In 2017, Young joined Brown for the duet "Setting the Night on Fire" on the deluxe edition of Brown's self-titled album.

At the 2020 CMT Music Awards, Young performed "Drowning" in honor of Brown, whose drummer, Kenny Dixon, was killed in a car accident in October 2019, during CMT Artists of the Year. Since then Young and Brown developed a deep beloved friendship.

Young told to People: "Kane and I have gotten to know each other over the years, from him being on tours with me, from us writing together, from me guesting on his album in the past. All of this stuff came together. 'Famous Friends' is fun, it's super uptempo and I got to sing with my buddy Kane. All of this worked out as perfect as it possibly could on one song."

Davidson, Rutherford, and Hamilton counties in Tennessee are referred to in the lyrics as it was written by native Chris Young along with Cary Barlowe and Corey Crowder.

Commercial performance
"Famous Friends" reached number one on the Billboard Country Airplay chart dated July 17, 2021, becoming Young's tenth number one single, and Brown's sixth. In December 2021, it was declared by Billboard the number one Country Airplay single of the year.

Music video
The music video was released on March 26, 2021, directed by Peter Zavadil. It was filmed in Gallatin, Tennessee, and included Young's and Brown's real-life friends, such as a firefighter, a dog walker, a teacher, a musician, and a cook, and footage of them performing on a housetop in Nashville.

Charts

Weekly charts

Year-end charts

Certifications

References

2021 singles
2021 songs
Chris Young (musician) songs
Kane Brown songs
Male vocal duets
Songs written by Cary Barlowe
Songs written by Corey Crowder (songwriter)
Songs written by Chris Young (musician)
RCA Records Nashville singles
Billboard Country Airplay number-one singles of the year
Songs about Tennessee
Music videos directed by Peter Zavadil